James McHenry (December 20, 1785 – July 21, 1845) was an American writer, physician, and diplomat.

Biography
He was born at Larne, Ireland and was educated in Dublin and Glasgow, In 1817 he emigrated to the United States and took up residence in Philadelphia, where he practised medicine. He was appointed in 1842 as United States counsel at Derry.

He died at Larne, on 21 July 1845.

Family
His son James, who died in 1891 at Kensington, was a well-known financier. 
His daughter Mary married Mr. J. Bellargee Cox of Philadelphia.

Works

 1808.         The Bard of Erin and Other Poems Mostly National.
 1810.         Patrick: A Poetical Tale Founded on Incidents Which Took Place in Ireland During the Unhappy Period of 1793.
 1822.         The Pleasures of Friendship: A Poem in Two Parts.
 1823.         Waltham: An American Revolutionary Tale in Three Cantos.
 1823. 	The Wilderness; or, Braddock's Times: A Tale of the West.
 1823.         The Spectre of the Forest; or, Annals of the Housatonic, A New-England Romance.
 1824. 	O'Halloran; or, the Insurgent Chief: An Irish Historical Tale of 1798.
 1825.         The Hearts of Steel: An Irish Historical Tale of the Last Century.
 1829. 	The Usurper: An Historical Tragedy in Five Acts.
 1830.         The Betrothed of Wyoming: An Historical Tale.
 1830.         Meredith; or, The Mystery of the Meschianza: A Tale of the American Revolution.
 1839.         To Britannia.
 1840.         The Antediluvians; or, The World Destroyed: A Narrative Poem in Ten Books.

Notes

References

Sullivan, Maureen Ann. (1999). "James McHenry (20 December 1785-21 July 1845)." In K. P. Ljungquist (Ed.), Dictionary of Literary Biography Vol. 202. Nineteenth-Century American Fiction Writers (Vol. 202, pp. 185–190). Detroit, MI: Gale.

External links
 http://theministerspen.blogspot.com/2011/01/james-mchenry.html

1785 births
1845 deaths
19th-century American novelists
19th-century American diplomats
American male novelists
Physicians from Philadelphia
19th-century American male writers